Tomoko Yoshihara (吉原知子 Yoshihara Tomoko, born 4 February 1970 in the Uryū District, Hokkaido) is a former volleyball player from Japan, who competed in the 1992, 1996, and 2004 Summer Olympics.  She captained the 2004 Olympic squad. Yoshihara played as a middle-blocker. She was named Best Server at the 1994 FIVB Women's World Championship.

After retiring in 2006, she completed a master's programme at the University of Tsukuba. Since 1 June 2015, she has been the head coach of the JT Marvelous volleyball team.

Honours
1990: 8th place in the World Championship
1991: 7th place in the World Cup
1992: 5th place in the Olympic Games
1994: 7th place in the World Championship
1995: 6th place in the World Cup
1996: 9th place in the Olympic Games
2003: 5th place in the World Cup
2004: 5th place in the Olympic Games

Individual awards
 1994 World Championship "Best Server"

References

External links
 FIVB biography
sports-reference
 JT Marvelous Manager Profile (Japanese)

1970 births
Living people
Japanese women's volleyball players
Pioneer Red Wings players
Volleyball players at the 1992 Summer Olympics
Volleyball players at the 1996 Summer Olympics
Volleyball players at the 2004 Summer Olympics
Olympic volleyball players of Japan
Place of birth missing (living people)
Asian Games medalists in volleyball
Volleyball players at the 1990 Asian Games
Volleyball players at the 1994 Asian Games
Medalists at the 1990 Asian Games
Medalists at the 1994 Asian Games
Asian Games bronze medalists for Japan
Goodwill Games medalists in volleyball
Competitors at the 1994 Goodwill Games